The 2018 wildfire season in Utah began around June, 2018.

Fires included:
 Trail Mountain Fire (June 6–June 27)
 West Valley Fire (June 27–August 7)
 Dollar Ridge Fire (July 1–October)
 Pole Creek Fire (September 6–October 6)

 
Wildfires
Wildfires in Utah